The Pierce Organ Pipe Factory was a historic factory building in Reading, Massachusetts. The oldest portion of the two-story wood-frame Italianate structure was built in 1852 by Samuel Pierce, who had begun the manufacture of organ pipes in his nearby house in the 1840s. The building was expanded several times over the 19th century.

The building was listed on the National Register of Historic Places in 1984.

On Friday October 14, 2011, the building was torn down to make way for the construction of an eight unit condominium.

See also
National Register of Historic Places listings in Reading, Massachusetts
National Register of Historic Places listings in Middlesex County, Massachusetts

References

External links
 MACRIS Listing - Pierce Organ Pipe Factory

Industrial buildings and structures on the National Register of Historic Places in Massachusetts
Reading, Massachusetts
National Register of Historic Places in Reading, Massachusetts
1852 establishments in Massachusetts
Buildings and structures demolished in 2011
Demolished buildings and structures in Massachusetts